Spin gapless semiconductors are a novel class of materials with unique electrical band structure for different spin channels in such a way that there is no band gap (i.e., 'gapless') for one spin channel while there is a finite gap in another spin channel.

In a spin-gapless semiconductor, conduction and valence band edges touch, so that no threshold energy is required to move electrons from occupied (valence) states to empty (conduction) states. This gives spin-gapless semiconductors unique properties: namely that their band structures are extremely sensitive to external influences (e.g., pressure or magnetic field). 

Because very little energy is needed to excite electrons in an SGS, charge concentrations are very easily ‘tuneable’. For example, this can be done by introducing a new element (doping) or by application of a magnetic or electric field (gating).

A new type of SGS identified in 2017, known as Dirac-type linear spin-gapless semiconductors, has linear dispersion and is considered an ideal platform for massless and dissipationless spintronics because spin-orbital coupling opens a gap for the spin fully polarized conduction and valence band, and as a result, the interior of the sample becomes an insulator, however, an electrical current can flow without resistance at the sample edge. This effect, the quantum anomalous Hall effect has only previously been realised in magnetically doped topological insulators.

As well as Dirac/linear SGSs, the other major category of SGS are parabolic spin gapless semiconductors. 

Electron mobility in such materials is two to four orders of magnitude higher than in classical semiconductors.

SGSs are topologically non-trivial.

Prediction and discovery
The spin gapless semiconductor was first proposed as a new spintronics concept and a new class of candidate spintronic materials in 2008 in a paper by Xiaolin Wang of the University of Wollongong in Australia.

Properties and applications
The dependence of bandgap on spin direction leads to high carrier-spin-polarization, and offers promising spin-controlled electronic and magnetic properties for spintronics applications.

The spin gapless semiconductor is a promising candidate material for spintronics because its charged particles can be fully spin-polarised, so that spin can be controlled via only a small applied external energy.

References

Condensed matter physics
Semiconductors
Spintronics